Funky Winkerbean was an American comic strip by Tom Batiuk. Distributed by North America Syndicate, a division of King Features Syndicate, it appeared in more than 400 newspapers worldwide.

While Batiuk was a 23-year-old middle school art teacher in Elyria, Ohio, he began drawing cartoons while supervising study hall. In 1970, his characters first appeared as a weekly panel, Rapping Around, on the teenage page of the Elyria Chronicle Telegram. In 1972, Batiuk reworked some of the characters into a daily strip, which he sold to Publishers-Hall Syndicate.

Throughout its 50-year run, the strip went through several format changes. For the first 20 years of its run, the characters did not age, and the strip was nominally episodic as opposed to a serial, with humor derived from visual gags and the eccentricity of the characters. In 1992, Batiuk rebooted the strip, establishing that the characters had graduated from high school in 1988, and the series began progressing in real time. In 2007, a second "time warp" occurred, this time taking the strip ten years into the future, ostensibly to 2017, although the events of the strip still reflect a contemporary setting. Following the 1992 reboot and especially after the 2007 time jump, the strip was recast as a serialized drama, though most strips still feature some humor, often based on wordplay. The more drama-oriented Funky Winkerbean featured story arcs revolving around such topics as terminal cancer, adoption, prisoners of war, drug abuse, post-traumatic stress, same-sex couples attending the senior prom, and interracial marriage.

On November 17, 2022, Batiuk announced that he would be retiring the strip at the end of the year.

Characters and story
Centered at Westview High School, influenced by Batiuk's alma mater of Midview High School near Grafton, Ohio, the strip initially focused on several students: Funky Winkerbean, Crazy Harry Klinghorn, Barry Balderman, "Bull" Bushka, Cindy Summers, Junebug, Roland, Livinia, Leslie P. "Les" Moore, majorette Holly Budd (daughter of Melinda Budd, original majorette for Westview High), and Lisa Crawford.

From 1972 to 1992, the strip was highly gag-oriented, with humor coming from physical and prop comedy and surreal situations: running gags included the school's computer having become sentient and subjecting the students to its obsession with Star Trek; student "Crazy" Harry's ability to play pizzas like records; the school's winless football team; and band director Harry L. Dinkle's attempts to win each year's "Battle of the Bands," despite the contest always coinciding with a natural disaster (usually heavy rain).

Although the titular everyman Funky Winkerbean was the ostensible main character, nerds Les Moore and Lisa Crawford became breakout characters and the strip's primary focus. Supporting characters included obsessive majorette Holly (who never removed her uniform), "Crazy" Harry (who lived in his locker), Jerome T. "Bull" Bushka (the school's star athlete and Les's tormentor), and popular girl Cindy. Rounding out the cast was the Westview High staff, including Principal Burch, counselor Fred Fairgood, secretary Betty Reynolds (who actually ran the school), football coach John "Jack" Stropp and Dinkle.

The name "Funky Winkerbean" was a composite from suggestions from some of Batiuk's art students.

1992 relaunch
In 1992, Batiuk changed the strip's format. It was established that Funky, Les, Cindy and all the rest of the previous cast had graduated from Westview in 1988; their college years were skipped, and the story continued in their adulthood. Subsequently, the characters aged in real time and underwent significant life changes. Funky married Cindy in 1998; they are now divorced. Les and Lisa married in a Halloween-themed 1996 story that saw them dressed as Batman and Robin. Funky now co-owned the local pizza parlor with Tony Montoni, Les taught English at Westview, Crazy Harry was the local mailman, Bull the Scapegoats' coach, and Cindy a national-level television newscaster. The strip followed their stories as well as those of a new generation at Westview, including Wally, Becky, Darin and Monroe. Overtly whimsical elements were now downplayed in favor of more grounded real-life incidents and stories, and some of the series' running gags from the 1972–92 years were recast in a more serious light. For instance, Bull's hectoring of Les became the focus of a storyline on domestic violence and child abuse when it was revealed that Bull abused Les to cope with being abused by his own father.

Though humorous storylines remained mainstay, Batiuk also examined real-life contemporary issues not normally seen on the comics page, such as:
 Teenage pregnancy: Lisa became pregnant as a teenager; she placed the child for adoption. Her son was, unknown to her, adopted by the Fairgoods, was named Darin, and is a current character in the strip. In July 2007, the two (unbeknownst to each other) filed paperwork in an attempt to contact one another. They meet shortly before Lisa's death.
 Suicide: A student named Susan Smith becomes deeply enamored with Les, but the crush on her teacher is unrequited due to his commitment to Lisa. Susan then attempts suicide, but gets medical attention in time. Later, Susan—apparently accepting that Les was unavailable—helps him get his marriage license when he fails to obtain it in time.
 Teen dating violence: After her appearance in the suicide storyline, Susan begins dating Westview High star quarterback and "big man on campus" Matt Miller, who is abusive and possessive with her. Les and Lisa are able to intervene and empower Susan to end the relationship. It is also revealed that Lisa's ex-boyfriend, Frankie, had abused teen-aged Lisa during their relationship before he got her pregnant.
 Censorship: John Howard, owner of the Comic Book Emporium, is persecuted by moralizers who accused him of corrupting children. Lisa successfully defends John in court.
 Dyslexia: Westview's top student, Barry Balderman, fails to take his exams, and thus to graduate. He is required to enroll in summer school, where he realizes one of his classmates is having trouble. Being dyslexic himself, Barry is able to diagnose the problem correctly.
 Gun violence: A student brings a gun to school, where it accidentally discharges. Principal Fairgood refuses to accept the student's "it was a mistake" rationale and suspends him.
 Steroids: Les is frustrated and exhausted by his efforts at weightlifting, then figures he can gain instant muscle through steroids. While he has some benefits such as overcoming his oft-difficult attempts to climb the school gym rope (in this case simply ripping it from the ceiling), his attempts to join the football team are rejected (the gag in that strip is that the coach knows Les has been using steroids to build up muscles, the reason behind the rejection is that football season is about to conclude). Les then starts seeing the early adverse effects of steroid usage; widespread acne; which horrifies him to the point he is suddenly jarred back into reality; his steroid usage only having been a nightmare.
 Capital punishment
 Academic dishonesty: Cindy uses crib notes for a hard test. She is exposed by Les, albeit innocently as he thought she dropped something and was retrieving it for her. The teacher attempts to get to the bottom of it without it going to the headmaster; however, when the teacher says "I was not born yesterday" and Cindy quips "That is for sure", she then finds herself in the headmaster's office.
 Alcoholism: Batiuk compiled the story of Funky's struggle with alcoholism and recovery in the book My Name Is Funky and I'm an Alcoholic. The book also provides information on how to help someone suffering from alcoholism.
 Drunk driving: A teen-aged Wally Winkerbean and his girlfriend, Becky Blackburn, get drunk at a party. On the way home, Wally drives off the road and the car rolls over. Becky is critically injured and eventually has her arm amputated, as part of a story arc exploring the consequences of Wally's actions.
 Land mines in Afghanistan: In 2005, Batiuk sent newlyweds Wally and Becky to Afghanistan as a part of an anti-landmine effort by the Vietnam Veterans of America Foundation; Wally nearly dies after stepping on a mine. He is saved when his Afghan companion Kahn manages to knock the mine away (which was a design that launches the explosive to chest level), only to be punched out for selling the Stinger that killed his fellow troops. The couple returns with an adopted daughter, Rana, who was left orphaned after her family was killed by a suicide bomber.

Lisa's story

A recurring storyline for many years was Lisa Moore's battle with breast cancer. She first dealt with it when diagnosed in 1999. Soon after, she learned that Holly Budd was also a breast cancer survivor. After going through chemotherapy and a mastectomy, Lisa's cancer went into remission. Lisa later used her law practice to defend a client who was wrongfully fired from her job due to disability, and still later, a client unjustly charged with selling pornographic comic books to children.

In March 2006, Lisa's cancer returned in a more serious form. Following another round of chemotherapy, her cancer appeared to go into remission again in early 2007, but on May 9, 2007, her doctor revealed that her medical charts had gotten mixed up and her disease was not only progressing, but had become inoperable. In a King Features press release, it was revealed that "Lisa will start chemo again, learn that her long-range prospects are poor, stop chemotherapy, deal with telling her daughter about her cancer situation, [and] testify before Congress about the need for cancer research and cope with friends and family." Batiuk was very open about the fact that Lisa's latest ordeal would end with her death and some of the events that would happen as a result.

The series polarized the comics community, with Batiuk being both praised for dealing with the topic and criticized for his graphic depiction of Lisa's slow deterioration and ultimate death. The entire storyline, which culminated with Lisa's death in the October 4, 2007, strip (excerpt at right), was collected and published in a book, Lisa's Story: The Other Shoe. This book, which includes the strips from Lisa's initial battle with cancer (which had itself been collected in book form in 2004), was published before the series had finished running in syndication. In 2007, Batiuk discussed his reasoning for pursuing the plotline, saying that he was inspired by his own battle against prostate cancer.

Second time jump

On October 21, 2007, Funky Winkerbean underwent its second "time warp," this time jumping 10 years ahead from Lisa's death and aging the cast of characters accordingly; those that were children are now high school age, and the original cast are in their mid-forties. Readers got a preview of the new-look feature starting with the October 5 strip in which a middle-aged widower Les talks to an unseen psychologist about events that immediately followed Lisa's passing, which are then depicted in flashback form. The October 21 strip shows a younger Les talking with Summer about death in general to help her understand that of Lisa's, before switching to the new-look Moores in the closing frames, and the first week of strips that followed, following the Moores participating in a Making Strides walk, have a banner saying "Act III: Ten Years Later" in the first frame (an "Act III" statement directing readers to the official website was discreetly included in fine print for some time afterward).

The relaunched Funky, Batiuk said, "is going to be a different strip, a little bit quieter." He also promised that despite Lisa's death, she will remain a presence in strip through flashbacks, remembrances, and a series of videos she recorded for daughter Summer just before she died. Montoni's will have opened several locations, including in New York City, Summer will have grown into a popular 15-year-old basketball star (in contrast to her geeky father), and Bull's adopted daughter Jinx, as well as Becky's adopted daughter Rana, are high-school aged. Batiuk explained that he wanted the comic to move so far ahead in order to prevent it from being an extended grieving process, to ensure that the next generation of students he followed were related to the original cast of characters, and to bring his original characters' ages closer to his target audience's. After the flash forward, all the strip's prominent adult male characters—Funky, Les, Bull and Crazy Harry—are 46 years old.

Major storylines
While a few of the mainstay elements—most notably, storylines revolving around the Westview High School band and now-retired director Harry Dinkle, and classroom spot gags—reappear in Act III on occasion, the focus once again is on dramatic storylines with continuing story arcs:

Return of Wally Winkerbean
Wally Winkerbean—who had returned to Iraq before the relaunch—is not in the core cast as shown on the Funky Winkerbean Web site, and it was also revealed that Becky had remarried (John Howard, owner of the Comics Emporium) sometime in the 10 years after Lisa's death. For nearly two years after the relaunch, Wally's fate remained unknown, although early on, Batiuk wrote on his blog that what happened to Wally "may not be what you think happened." Batiuk also revealed that a "clue" to Wally's fate could be found in the October 11 strip, which features Les getting mugged in New York after Lisa's death after walking past a newspaper vending machine with a headline saying "Soldiers Taken Hostage."

Several strips made allusions to Wally's disappearance, including one featuring Becky Howard's car having a POW/MIA bumper sticker and her placing a U.S. flag on an unidentified grave. In the July 12, 2009, strip, it is finally shown that Wally is alive and in full military uniform; a backstory reveals that Funky got a call from his ex-wife, Cindy, informing him that Wally was alive and that she had conducted an interview that was to air on the news that evening. It is revealed that Wally has been held as a prisoner of war in Iraq for the past decade (possibly taken hostage around the time of Lisa's death), and—unaware that he was presumed dead and that Becky had remarried—said during that interview that what kept him sane during his time in captivity was thinking about his wife and family. Funky visits the Howards to reveal that Wally is alive and in good health. In the August 9, 2009, strip, it is revealed that the grave Becky had visited all these years was that of Wally's assumed remains. Wally has made occasional appearances since his return to Westview, and his first appearance as a central character in a storyline that began on February 1, 2010.

Other storylines
Darin Fairgood, another prominent character who appeared in the strip throughout the 1990s and 2000s, had also been unseen since the 2007 relaunch, but has recently reappeared in the strip helping his old high school buddy Pete Roberts move back into town. Pete is the latest resident of the apartment above Montoni's. Les and Lisa lived there before buying their home. Becky and Wally took it over, and then apparently during the time jump John and Becky lived there together before John turned it into a storage space for his comics, probably since the basement shop has flooded in the past.

During 2010, Funky became the central character in a storyline in which he has a flashback to his high school days 30 years earlier in Westview. The flashback ran concurrently with a storyline where Funky was seriously injured in a car accident, caused by a young woman whose car veers into the path of Funky's car while she was talking on a cellphone while driving. During several flashback scenes, Funky had seen (and in some cases, visited with) teen-aged versions of himself, Crazy Harry and Holly Budd (Funky's wife-to-be), and a younger Mr. Dinkle—all as they appeared in Funky Winkerbean  strips in the early 1980s. Although the recovery aspect of the accident storyline continued into the fall, the flashback scenes ended when Funky regained consciousness at the hospital.

A storyline that began in April 2012 featured a same-sex couple wanting to go to Westview High School's prom together and purchasing tickets from Jinx Bushka, a member of the Senior Prom committee. The story explored the reaction from Westview residents, most notably anti-LBGT activist and head of the Senior Prom parent volunteers Roberta Blackburn, who launches an effort to stop the couple from attending prom by forming a protest outside the school. When a group of students led by Summer Moore supporting LBGT couples attending the prom plan a counter-protest, principal Nate Green defuses the situation by calling a school assembly and announces that gay couples will be allowed to attend the prom, and that he will not have intolerance at Westview High School be a policy issue during his tenure.

Some time after Lisa's death, Les begins dating Cayla Williams, a black teacher at Westview High. Their relationship blossoms into love and in the fall of 2012, the two were married. Also that fall, Les's daughter, Summer, and Cayla's daughter, Keisha, begin attending college. In April 2013, a storyline began revolving around Darin Fairgood's biological father, Frankie, attempting to meet his biological son; this coincided with the release of Les's book Lisa's Story, detailing her life, battle with breast cancer and events since her death. Frankie eventually meets with Darin, attempting to blackmail him into doing a reality series about their reunion, but Les, Cayla and the rest of the gang—aware that the show's only objective was to tarnish Lisa's name and character—help Darin thwart Frankie's plans.

In January 2013, Fred Fairgood—now retired as principal of Westview High—suffered a major stroke and was barely alive at the hospital; he is later shown to be recovering at home, although he is disabled. As Fred is beginning his recovery, a woman identifying herself as Fred's daughter (from a previous relationship, before he married Ann) shows up at the hospital and proves that she is indeed his biological daughter. Ann Fairgood is forced to admit that her marriage to Fred was not the happy one they had made it out to be publicly and that they shielded Darin from their unhappiness, upsetting Darin to the point he estranges himself from the family.

In 2011, before Fred Fairgood fell ill, another longtime Westview staff member—Jock Strapp, the former football coach and physical education teacher—had died of prostate cancer, although this was acknowledged only briefly.

In 2013 Funky's wife Holly—whose son Cory is in Afghanistan—finds that he has an old "Starbuck Jones" comic book collection and begins collecting missing issues to make the collection complete; she soon has issues #7; #123; #54; #104; #36 {on eBay}; #216; and in July 2014 during a week-long cliffhanger searches for the rare and elusive #115. First missing it at a comic book convention and then losing it when her credit card would not work, she finally finds #115, along with an equally rare "Ashcan" version {a penciled version of a comic strip before the final printing}. When a couple gives her a "Starbuck Jones" comic book Holly presents them with a "Holy Grail" of Action Comics #243.

During the summer of 2015, the present-day incarnations of the Westview gang meet up with their teen-aged selves during a class reunion; it is revealed in the storyline's finale that Les—who helped organize the event—had passed out during the reunion (for unexplained reasons) and was having a dream.

In 2019, Bull dealt with the effects of chronic traumatic encephalopathy. The storyline included Bull's death.

Continuity with other strips
The continuity of the Crankshaft strip is as much as 20 years behind that of Funky Winkerbean; strips in both comics in August and September 2011 show Cayla Williams, a high school teacher and secretary to Principal Nate Green and Les's fiancée, with Keisha her teenage daughter, to be a college-age student in the former. In the January 27, 2015, installment of Funky Winkerbean a throwback crossover shows Crankshaft as a bus driver while Crankshaft also has a throwback crossover that shows Crankshaft as a bus driver on Funky Winkerbean. This time difference between the strips was gradually retconned away as Funky Winkerbean finished its run in 2022, with the characters crossing over more frequently through the year in the same timeframe, culminating in the week leading up to Christmas showing characters traveling to and meeting up at a church choir concert in Crankshaft's Centerville.

On January 19, 2015, Funky Winkerbean began a crossover with Dick Tracy when two of the Winkerbean characters decided to attend a police auction of stolen comic books recovered from the Dick Tracy criminal the "Jumbler". Dick Tracy has a concurrent crossover with Funky Winkerbean concerning the comic book auction.

Third time jump (the final week)
Funky and the rest of the cast last appeared on the Christmas Day 2022 episode. The final week was set in the late 21st century. Summer's granddaughter (also named Lisa) found two books in a robot-staffed bookstore; Westview, written by Summer, and Lisa's Story: The Other Shoe, written by Les. It was explained that a mass book burning had taken place in the past, but somehow these books survived, and Summer was famous due to the success of Westview. The last episode saw Lisa's mother telling her to retire for the night, and the final panel had both books on Lisa's bed. John Byrne did the art for the final week.

Controversy
The more dramatic turns of the storyline have led to mixed responses from readers. Negative reaction to a 2007 strip featuring Wally getting blown up by an I.E.D. (which turned out in the next strip to be him playing a computer game), included two papers that ran the strip receiving irate phone calls and letters to the editor, and led to Batiuk issuing an apology soon after the strip ran.

Reactions to the most recent chapter of Lisa's Story led to further complaints over the comic's gloomy content, and Batiuk has mentioned in interviews about the storyline that he has received complaints about the current direction of the storyline. Web comic Shortpacked produced a satirical strip in which most of the words of Funky Winkerbean characters' dialogue are replaced by the word "cancer." The Comics Curmudgeon also makes frequent reference to the seemingly unremitting gloom of the strip, calling it "a black hole of bleakness and depression and cancer from which no joy or laughter can escape."  The strip has also inspired a blog, Son of Stuck Funky, which provides a daily commentary.

A Crankshaft strip from May 23, 2007, sarcastically addresses the more recent controversies from Batiuk's perspective, with a character remarking of newspaper comic strips that "everyone knows they're supposed to be funny". In the Funky Winkerbean strip published on September 30, 2007, Les essentially echoes the Crankshaft comment.

In a September 2009 storyline that many readers also interpreted as Batiuk's addressing of the strip's latter-day bleakness, a group of parents protested a school production of Wit because the themes of cancer and death offended them. In her defense of the play, the character of Susan Smith, a Westview High teacher and drama director, was viewed by critics as a mouthpiece for Batiuk's views on the importance of dramatic entertainment.

Over the week of July 7, 2008, Pearls Before Swine parodied the tendency of Funky Winkerbean towards killing off main characters when it killed off Rat and the strip's own author, Stephan Pastis (the two would later be returned to the strip via the intervention of the head of United Feature Syndicate), with Tom Batiuk even allowing Pastis to use his representation of the Angel of Death in the second to last strip in the series. A year earlier, as part of a long series featuring multiple storylines, Pastis remarked to Pig that serial strips handle long stories better and featured Funky, Holly, Lisa, and Les in a parody referencing, among other things, Lisa's breast cancer. Pastis was given Batiuk's blessing to run the strip, but just before it was scheduled to run the controversy over the cancer storyline grew to the point where Pastis pulled it from publication as he believed, although he never mentioned the disease by name, anyone who read his strip could infer that he was making light of cancer patients and Pastis did not wish to have Pearls drawn into the controversy.

Spinoffs
Two minor characters have been spun off into their own strips: the bus driver Crankshaft in 1987 and the talk show host John Darling in 1979. The latter caused a sensation in 1990 when Batiuk had Darling murdered in the penultimate strip after a real-life financial dispute with the strip's syndicator. In Funky Winkerbean, Les Moore wrote a book about Darling's murder and solved the case in a 1997 storyline.

Comic book connections
Batiuk's neighbor, comic book writer Tony Isabella, occasionally appears in the strip as himself. Another comic book creator, superhero artist John Byrne, drew ten weeks of the strip while Batiuk was recovering from foot surgery and has appeared in the strip himself as a character.

Batiuk also occasionally parodies covers of classic Silver Age comics to comment on storyline elements in the strip itself. This is usually done in the Sunday comic and features a cover and a current storyline being highlighted.  The most recent example featured Superboy Volume 1, #57. This cover showed the title character playing many positions in baseball and highlighting a current (2012–13) storyline where Bull Bushka is Westview High School's Athletic Director, Girls Basketball Coach, and was named the school's head football coach.

Montoni's Pizza is modeled after Luigi's, an Italian restaurant and pizzeria in downtown Akron, Ohio. There is a framed and signed Funky Winkerbean strip hung in the restaurant. The band box frequently shown in the interior of the shop above the entrance is an actual fixture in the restaurant.

After the second time skip, Batiuk designed the comic book store around the shop he frequents, Ground Zero Comics and Cards in Strongsville, Ohio.  Captain America's shield that is frequently shown in the background is on the mantel in the shop.

The character Harry L. Dinkle, the self-proclaimed "World's Greatest Band Director," is based on the director of The Ohio State University Marching Band. Professor Dinkle is based on a composite of past directors Dr. Paul Droste and Dr. Jon Woods. In addition, a 2006 article from the Cleveland Free Times asserts that Harry L. Dinkle is based on Harry Pfingsten, a retired band director from Avon Lake, Ohio, who was the band director of the junior high school that Tom Batiuk attended. In 1989, Harry L. Dinkle was the first comic strip character ever to "march" the Tournament of Roses
parade. Dinkles, a brand of shoe designed for marching bands, is named after the character and claims to have been endorsed by Dinkle since 1986.

Musical
Batiuk assisted in the writing of a stage musical adaptation of the strip, entitled Funky Winkerbean's Homecoming, set in the era while Funky was a Westview High student.  It was performed by at least one high school drama group, beginning in 1988. Despite the title, as is true of the strip, Funky is actually a fairly minor character in the play; the focal character of Funky Winkerbean's Homecoming is Les Moore.

The musical was co-written by Andy Clark, who much later appeared as himself in the comic strip in December 2006. Clark is a publisher of the C. L. Barnhouse Company, and has published several Funky Winkerbean collections dedicated to the character of Harry L. Dinkle.

Compilations

 The Complete Funky Winkerbean: Volume 2 (1975–77), Kent State University Press, 2013
 The Complete Funky Winkerbean: Volume 3 (1978–80), Kent State University Press, 2014
 The Complete Funky Winkerbean: Volume 4 (1981–83), Kent State University Press, 2015
 The Complete Funky Winkerbean: Volume 5 (1984–86), Kent State University Press, 2016
 The Complete Funky Winkerbean: Volume 6 (1987–89), Kent State University Press, 2017
 The Complete Funky Winkerbean: Volume 7 (1990–92), Kent State University Press, 2018
 The Complete Funky Winkerbean: Volume 8 (1993–95), Kent State University Press, 2019
 The Complete Funky Winkerbean: Volume 9 (1996–98), Kent State University Press, 2020
 The Complete Funky Winkerbean: Volume 10 (1999-2001), Kent State University Press, 2021
 The Complete Funky Winkerbean: Volume 11 (2002-2004), Kent State University Press, 2022

References

External links
 Official Funky Winkerbean website
 Funky Winkerbean at King Features
 Funky Winkerbean at Don Markstein's Toonopedia. Archived from the original on April 16, 2012.

American comic strips
1972 comics debuts
Winkerbean, Funky
Satirical comics
Winkerbean, Funky
Winkerbean, Funky
Gag-a-day comics
Teenage characters in comics
Teen comedy comics
Comic strips set in the United States
Ohio in fiction
2022 comics endings
Comic strips ended in the 2020s